Arthur Stanley Mercer (28 December 1902 – 2 October 1994) was an English professional footballer who played as an inside right in the Football League for Chester, Wigan Borough, Halifax Town, Sheffield United, Bristol City and Bury.

Personal life 
Mercer was the brother of fellow footballers David and Richard. His nephew David also became a professional footballer.

References 

1902 births
1994 deaths
Association football inside forwards
Bristol City F.C. players
Bury F.C. players
Chester City F.C. players
Connah's Quay & Shotton F.C. players
Dartford F.C. players
English Football League players
English footballers
Footballers from St Helens, Merseyside
Halifax Town A.F.C. players
Rhyl F.C. players
Sheffield United F.C. players
Wigan Borough F.C. players